Recce is an Indian Telugu-language crime-thriller web series directed by Poluru Krishna. It featured Sriram, Siva Balaji, Dhanya Balakrishna, Saranya Pradeep, Rajashree, Aadukalam Naren and Ester Noronha in main roles. Recce premiered on 17 June 2022 on ZEE5. As of 22 June 2022, it has 40 million streaming minutes.

Synopsis 
In 1992, in Tadipatri of Andhra Pradesh, a son consumed by greed and lust hires people to kill his own father and ends up falling to his own demise. S.I Lenin who investigates these murders uncovers the underbelly of familial relationships that when consumed by jealousy, lust and greed, even families can turn lethal.

Cast 

 Sriram as Lenin
 Siva Balaji as Chalapathi
 Dhanya Balakrishna as Gouri
 Aadukalam Naren as Varadarajulu
 Ester Noronha as Rekha
 Jeeva as MLA Guruva Reddy
 Saranya Pradeep as Bujjamma
 Rajashree as Devakamma
 Ramaraju as Ranganayakulu
 Thotapalli Madhu as Kullayappa
 Sameer as Police Officer
 Sammeta Gandhi as Paradesi
 Uma Daanam Kumar as Basha
 Krishna Kanth Subbadu
 Murali Basava
 Surya Theja E.O
 Mani Nallanji
 Koteshwar Rao S.P. Sanjay
 Swami Naidu Constable Swami
 Prabhavathi Constable Swami's Wife

Episodes

Release 
Recce was premiered on ZEE5 on 17 June 2022.

Reception 
The Times of India gave a rating of 3.5 out of 5 and stated that "Poluru Krishna, who also worked on story adaptation, screenplay and dialogues, did a fabulous job narrating this bold and gripping crime thriller". 123Telugu opined that Recce is "one of the finest political crime thrillers with some decent performances, and excellent background score". Satya Pulagam of ABP Nadu appreciated cinematography, background score and screenplay by Poluru Krishna.

References

External links 

 

 Recce  at ZEE5
2022 web series debuts
Telugu-language web series
Telugu-language television shows
ZEE5 original programming
Indian thriller television series
Indian crime television series
Crime thriller web series
Crime drama web series
Indian mystery television series
Indian crime drama television series